"Bake Sale" is a song by American rapper Wiz Khalifa featuring fellow American rapper Travis Scott. It was released on January 21, 2016 as the lead single from the former's 2016 compilation album Khalifa. It was produced by TM88, Juicy J, Lex Luger, Crazy Mike, and DJ Spinz, based on one of the latter's produced songs, "Order More" by G-Eazy.

Music video
The official music video was released on April 26, 2016.

Charts 
On the week of February 13, 2016, "Bake Sale" debuted at number 56 on the Billboard Hot 100, but left the next week. It reappeared on the chart at number 74 the week of February 27 before exiting the chart. On the Hot R&B/Hip-Hop Songs chart, it debuted and peaked at number 18 the week of February 13, staying on the chart for nine weeks. The song debuted and peaked at number 71 on the Canadian Hot 100 for the week of February 27.

Certifications

References

External links

2016 singles
2016 songs
Wiz Khalifa songs
Atlantic Records singles
Songs written by Wiz Khalifa
Songs written by Travis Scott
Songs about cannabis
Travis Scott songs
Song recordings produced by Lex Luger (musician)
Songs written by DJ Spinz
Songs written by Juicy J
Songs written by Lex Luger (musician)